Antonietta Paoli Pogliani (9 November 1886 – 3 January 1956) was an Italian sculptor. Her work was part of the sculpture event in the art competition at the 1924 Summer Olympics.

References

Bibliography 
 
 

1886 births
1956 deaths
19th-century Italian sculptors
20th-century Italian sculptors
Italian women sculptors
Olympic competitors in art competitions
People from Asti
20th-century Italian women